Đorđe Mihailović (Thessaloniki, 1 May 1928) is a keeper of Serbian Military Cemetery at Zeitenlik, in Thessaloniki. For more than half a century Đorđe Mihailović welcomes and sends off the descendants of Serbian soldiers who died in Salonika front during the First World War. He shows them where the bones of their ancestors are stored.

The first keeper of the graveyard was Đorđe's grandfather, Serbian military volunteer Savo Mihailović, a Serb from Grbalj, near Boka Kotorska. Savo collected the bodies of his dead friends and comrades, and then protected and guarded the cemetery until his death in 1928. After his death, his remains were also buried in Zeitenlik. Savo was succeeded by his son Đuro Mihailović (Đorđe's father), who succeeded in preserving the cemetery and relics from Nazi looting during World War II. Đuro died in 1961 and was buried along with his father on Zeitenlik. Duty to guard the cemetery was given to Đorđe, the last male descendant of the Mihailović line. In 2020 he was awarded Serbian citizenship.

Today, the keeper, host and curator of the Serbian Military Cemetery at Zeitenlik is Đorđe Mihailović, Đuro's son and Savo's grandson, who lives in the keepers house with his wife and daughter.

Other 
Raša Perić dedicated the song to keeper of Zeitenlik, Đorđe Mihailović: "Marching all night". A documentary about Đorđe Mihailović titled: "The Last Guardian" was filmed in 2013.

Awards
  Order of the Serbian Flag (2014)
 Mother Serbia (2021)

References 

1928 births
Living people
Greek people of Serbian descent
People from Thessaloniki
20th-century Serbian people
Serbia in World War I
Serbian people of Montenegrin descent